Richard Barnett (born October 2, 1936)  is an American former basketball player who was a shooting guard in the National Basketball Association (NBA) for the Syracuse Nationals, Los Angeles Lakers and New York Knicks. He won two NBA championships with the Knicks. Barnett was also a member of the Cleveland Pipers in the American Basketball League. He played college basketball at Tennessee A&I College.

Early years
Barnett attended Theodore Roosevelt High School in a segregated society. Although he struggled as a student at school, he became one of the best basketball players in the state of Indiana.

As a senior, he led his team to the state basketball championship, which was the first final where 2 predominant African American basketball squads faced each other. The team lost to Crispus Attucks High School and their future NBA star Oscar Robertson. He received All-state honors.

College career
Barnett accepted a basketball scholarship from Tennessee A&I College, to play under legendary coach John McLendon. As a freshman, he was given the nickname "Dick the Skull". He was known for his trademark "question mark" jump shot, with an unusual technique of kicking his legs back as he released the ball with his left hand, taunting the defenders by saying, "Too late; Fall back baby".

He became a three-time Associated Press Little College All-American, helping the school to a 36-game winning streak and three consecutive NAIA national championship titles. In 1957, he was the first African American to be named to the National All-American team. He received back-to-back championship MVP honors in 1958 and 1959.

Barnett graduated as the school's All-time scorer with 3,209 points for a 23.6 average in 136 games, while also recording 1,571 career rebounds for an 11.6 average, a career shooting percentage of 44.8 and 80.0 from the free throw line.

In 1986, he was inducted into the NAIA Hall of Fame. In 1990, the school retired his No. 12 Jersey. In 1993, he was inducted into the Indiana Basketball Hall of Fame. In 2005, he was inducted into the Tennessee Sports Hall of Fame. In 2007, he was inducted into the National Collegiate Basketball Hall of Fame, along with his coach John McLendon. In 2012, he was named to the NAIA 75th Anniversary All-Star Team. In 2016, he was inducted into the Small College Basketball Hall of Fame. In 2019 the 1957–59 Tennessee A&I Tigers men's basketball team was inducted into the Naismith Basketball Hall of Fame.

Professional career

Syracuse Nationals
Barnett was selected by the Syracuse Nationals (now the Philadelphia 76ers) in the first round (4th overall) of the 1959 NBA draft. He was used in a sixth man role behind guards Larry Costello and Hal Greer. As a rookie, he averaged 12.4 points per game. In the 1960–61 season, he scored 16.9 points, which ranked seventh among the league's backcourt players.

Cleveland Pipers
In 1961, he signed with the Cleveland Pipers of the American Basketball League (ABL), which were owned by George Steinbrenner (the future owner of the New York Yankees) and coached by John McLendon. He was a part of the 1961–62 ABL Championship team. 

On December 21, 1961, the Nationals won a court order barring him from playing that season in the rival American Basketball League.

Los Angeles Lakers
On September 7, 1962, the Syracuse Nationals sold his player rights to the Los Angeles Lakers, for $35,000, which at the time was the highest player-for-money transaction in league history. He was also used in a sixth man role with the Lakers, behind Elgin Baylor and Jerry West. He helped the team win the Western Division title after West missed 27 games with a leg injury.

Famous Laker announcer Chick Hearn nicknamed him "Fall Back Baby". Off the court, he was also known for his sharp wit. He averaged 16.8 points, 3.0 rebounds and 2.7 assists during his 3 seasons with the team.

New York Knicks
On October 14, 1965, he was traded to the New York Knicks in exchange for Bob Boozer and cash considerations. In his first season, he led the team in scoring with a 23.1 average. In 1968, he made his only All-Star appearance.

In 1970, he helped the Knicks beat the Lakers for the NBA title. In 1973, he contributed to the team winning a second championship against the Lakers. He was released on October 23, 1973. He scored 15,358 regular season points in his career. In 1990, the Knicks retired his No. 12 jersey in the rafters of Madison Square Garden.

NBA career statistics

Regular season 

|-
| style="text-align:left;"| 
| style="text-align:left;"|Syracuse
| 57 || – || 21.7 || .412 || – || .711 || 2.7 || 2.8 || – || – || 12.4
|-
| style="text-align:left;"| 
| style="text-align:left;"|Syracuse
| 78 || – || 26.5 || .452 || – || .712 || 3.6 || 2.8 || – || – || 16.9
|-
| style="text-align:left;"| 
| style="text-align:left;"|L.A. Lakers
| style="background:#cfecec;"|80* || – || 31.8 || .471 || – || .815 || 3.0 || 2.8 || – || – || 18.0
|-
| style="text-align:left;"| 
| style="text-align:left;"|L.A. Lakers
| 78 || – || 33.6 || .452 || – || .773 || 3.2 || 3.1 || – || – || 18.4
|-
| style="text-align:left;"| 
| style="text-align:left;"|L.A. Lakers
| 74 || – || 27.4 || .413 || – || .799 || 2.7 || 2.1 || – || – || 13.8
|-
| style="text-align:left;"| 
| style="text-align:left;"|New York
| 79 || – || 34.5 || .469 || – || .772 || 4.1 || 3.5 || – || – || 23.1
|-
| style="text-align:left;"| 
| style="text-align:left;"|New York
| 67 || – || 29.4 || .478 || – || .783 || 3.4 || 2.4 || – || – || 17.0
|-
| style="text-align:left;"| 
| style="text-align:left;"|New York
| 81 || – || 30.7 || .482 || – || .780 || 2.9 || 3.0 || – || – || 18.0
|-
| style="text-align:left;"| 
| style="text-align:left;"|New York
| 82 || – || 36.0 || .463 || – || .774 || 3.1 || 3.5 || – || – || 17.6
|-
| style="text-align:left;background:#afe6ba;"| †
| style="text-align:left;"|New York
| style="background:#cfecec;"|82* || – || 33.8 || .475 || – || .714 || 2.7 || 3.6 || – || – || 14.9
|-
| style="text-align:left;"| 
| style="text-align:left;"|New York
| 82 || – || 34.7 || .456 || – || .694 || 2.9 || 2.7 || – || – || 15.5
|-
| style="text-align:left;"|
| style="text-align:left;"|New York
| 79 || – || 28.6 || .437 || – || .753 || 1.9 || 2.5 || – || – || 12.2
|-
| style="text-align:left;background:#afe6ba;"| †
| style="text-align:left;"|New York
| 51 || – || 10.1 || .389 || – || .533 || 0.8 || 1.0 || – || – || 3.8
|-
| style="text-align:left;"| 
| style="text-align:left;"|New York
| 5 || – || 11.6 || .385 || – || .667 || 0.8 || 1.2 || 0.2 || 0.0 || 4.4
|- class="sortbottom"
| style="text-align:center;" colspan="2"| Career
| 971 || – || 29.8 || .456 || – || .761 || 2.9 || 2.8 || 0.2 || 0.0 || 15.8
|- class="sortbottom"
| style="text-align:center;" colspan="2"| All-Star
| 1 || 0 || 22.0 || .583 || – || .500 || 0.0 || 1.0 || – || – || 15.0

Playoffs 

|-
|style="text-align:left;"|1960
|style="text-align:left;"|Syracuse
|3||–||21.3||.316||–||.857||4.7||1.3||–||–||10.0
|-
|style="text-align:left;"|1961
|style="text-align:left;"|Syracuse
|8||–||28.3||.438||–||.722||4.5||1.5||–||–||15.5
|-
|style="text-align:left;"|1963
|style="text-align:left;"|L.A. Lakers
|13||–||28.5||.470||–||.794||2.9||1.6||–||–||16.8
|-
|style="text-align:left;"|1964
|style="text-align:left;"|L.A. Lakers
|5||–||30.8||.404||–||.844||1.6||3.4||–||–||13.8
|-
|style="text-align:left;"|1965
|style="text-align:left;"|L.A. Lakers
|10||–||28.7||.480||–||.795||3.0||3.3||–||–||17.5
|-
|style="text-align:left;"|1968
|style="text-align:left;"|New York
|6||–||35.2||.521||–||.724||4.5||3.5||–||–||23.8
|-
|style="text-align:left;"|1969
|style="text-align:left;"|New York
|10||–||40.2||.399||–||.685||3.5||2.7||–||–||16.7
|-
|style="text-align:left;background:#afe6ba;"|1970†
|style="text-align:left;"|New York
|19||–||37.6||.468||–||.776||2.1||3.4||–||–||16.9
|-
|style="text-align:left;"|1971
|style="text-align:left;"|New York
|12||–||37.9||.477||–||.698||3.2||3.0||–||–||19.5
|-
|style="text-align:left;"|1972
|style="text-align:left;"|New York
|12||–||10.9||.469||–||.417||0.7||0.8||–||–||4.3
|-
| style="text-align:left;background:#afe6ba;"|1973†
|style="text-align:left;"|New York
|4||–||4.3||.500||–||–||0.0||0.5||–||–||1.5
|-
|- class="sortbottom"
| style="text-align:center;" colspan="2"| Career
| 102 || – || 29.7 || .458 || – || .748 || 2.7 || 2.4 || – || – || 15.1

Personal life
Barnett, who holds a PhD in education from Fordham University, is now retired from teaching Sports Management at St. John's University in New York as of 2007.

Documentary
In April 2022, a documentary titled The Dream Whisperer about Barnett and his Tennessee A&I Tigers teams that won the NAIA Division I men's basketball tournament three times in a row between 1957-1959, was released.

See also
1957 NAIA Division I men's basketball tournament
1958 NAIA Division I men's basketball tournament
1959 NAIA Division I men's basketball tournament
NAIA Basketball Tournament Most Valuable Player

References

External links
 Leggett, William. "A New Knick With A Knack," Sports Illustrated, January 17, 1966.
 Official Website

1936 births
Living people
Basketball players from Gary, Indiana
Forwards (basketball)
Guards (basketball)
Tennessee State Tigers basketball players
Syracuse Nationals players
Cleveland Pipers players
Los Angeles Lakers players
New York Knicks players
American Basketball League (1961–62) players
National Basketball Association All-Stars
National Basketball Association players with retired numbers
National Collegiate Basketball Hall of Fame inductees
American men's basketball players
Syracuse Nationals draft picks
 Fordham University alumni